One Car Too Far was an American reality television series. It starred Gary Humphrey and Bill Wu. It premiered on Discovery Channel on August 19, 2012.

Content
Lasting for five episodes, One Car Too Far is a miniseries in which former United Kingdom Special Forces soldier Gary Humphrey and California-based automotive enthusiast Bill Wu attempt to survive various climates using only the parts of an automobile.

Critical reception
Allison Keene of the Hollywood Reporter gave the show a mixed review, saying that its "reason for existence may be without explanation" but that "its general theme of 'how to use all of a car’s parts to survive' is engaging enough".

Episodes

References

External links
 

2012 American television series debuts
2010s American reality television series
English-language television shows
Discovery Channel original programming
Works about survival skills
2012 American television series endings